Defibrillatour (stylized DeFibRilLaTouR) is a 2012 concert tour by American industrial metal band Ministry in support of their twelfth studio album, Relapse. It was their first tour in four years as well as their first in six years with guitarist Mike Scaccia (as well as their final, due to his death in December 2012).

Background
After Ministry broke up in 2008, frontman Al Jourgensen stated in interviews that a reunion would never happen. In the November 2008 issue of Hustler Magazine, Jourgensen said that the reason they were breaking up was that they "take up so much time" as well as the hassle of getting out new albums. He also said he was responsible for six other bands and can get seven albums done a year while not working on new Ministry material.

On August 7, 2011, it was confirmed that Ministry had reformed and were going to play at Germany's Wacken Open Air festival, set to take place August 2–4, 2012. Later that month, Jourgensen told Metal Hammer that Ministry had begun work on Relapse, which they hope to release by Christmas. Regarding the sound of the new material, he explained, "We've only got five songs to go. I've been listening to it the last couple of weeks and I wasn't really in the mood, I was just taking it as a joke. Just to pass the time at first but [Mikey's] raving about it. It's like, dude c'mon, this is not about Bush, so... that part's over. The ulcers are gone and Bush is gone so it's time for something new. I think this is actually gonna wind up being the fastest and heaviest record I've ever done. Just because we did it as anti-therapy therapy against the country music we would just take days off and thrash faster than I've done in a long time, faster than Mikey's done in a long time. He just did a Rigor Mortis tour and said it was easy compared to this Ministry stuff so it's gonna be brutal and it's gonna freak a lot of people out."

In addition to the Wacken Open Air appearance, the band will play five North American dates and will not be adding any more cities to the Defibrillatour tour, as the band is scheduled to perform in Tuska Open Air Metal Festival in Finland June 29–July 1, 2012.

Tour dates

Completed

Cancelled

References

Ministry (band) concert tours
2012 concert tours
Reunion concert tours